Mahaney's theorem is a theorem in computational complexity theory proven by Stephen Mahaney that states that if any sparse language is NP-complete, then P = NP.

Mahaney's argument does not actually require the sparse language to be in NP, so there is a sparse NP-hard set if and only if P = NP. This is because the existence of an NP-hard sparse set implies the existence of an NP-complete sparse set.

References

Computational complexity theory